Baileysville High School was a high school located in Wyoming County, West Virginia.  It was closed in 2002 after consolidating with nearby Oceana High School to form Westside High School. 

Baileysville High School's mascot was the Rough Rider and the school colors were red, white and blue with blue being the dominant color.

Feeder schools for Baileysville High School included Baileysville Elementary School and Huff Consolidated Elementary School and Coal Mt. Elementary.

Notable alumni
Jamie Noble a retired professional wrestler from the World Wrestling Entertainment (WWE).

Defunct schools in West Virginia
Educational institutions disestablished in 2002
Former school buildings in the United States
Schools in Wyoming County, West Virginia
2002 establishments in West Virginia